The 2002–03 First League of the Republika Srpska season was the eighth since its establishment.

Clubs and stadiums

League standings

External links
BIHSoccer.com

Bos
2002–03 in Bosnia and Herzegovina football
First League of the Republika Srpska seasons